Harrison  is an "L" subway station on the CTA's Red Line in Printer's Row, Chicago in the Loop. The station opened on October 17, 1943, as part of the State Street subway. In 2006, the KDR standard signage at Harrison was replaced by the newer Current Graphic Standard signage. On February 9, 2009, an auxiliary entrance at Polk Street that was closed in 1968 was reopened due to an increase of both business and residents living in the South Loop neighborhood. On April 14, 2014, the Polk Street auxiliary entrance was temporarily closed, reopening on May 25, 2014. Later the same year, the main entrance closed on June 16 and reopened on July 28. The station entrance at Harrison is located directly in front of Jones College Prep High School.

Bus connections
CTA
  2 Hyde Park Express (Weekday Rush Hours only) 
  6 Jackson Park Express  (Southbound)
  10 Museum Of Science & Industry (Memorial Day through Labor Day only) 
  29 State 
  62 Archer (Owl Service) 
  130 Museum Campus (Memorial Day through Labor Day only) 
  146 Inner Lake Shore/Michigan Express

Notes and references

Notes

References

External links

 Harrison Station Page at  Chicago-'L'.org
 Train schedule (PDF) at CTA official site
Harrison Station Page CTA official site
Harrison Street entrance from Google Maps Street View
Polk Street entrance from Google Maps Street View

CTA Red Line stations
Railway stations in the United States opened in 1943